In mathematics, the Abel–Plana formula is a summation formula discovered independently by  and . It states that 

For the case  we have

It holds for functions ƒ that are holomorphic in the region Re(z) ≥ 0, and satisfy a suitable growth condition in this region; for example it is enough to assume that |ƒ| is  bounded by C/|z|1+ε in this region for some constants C, ε > 0, though the formula also holds under much weaker bounds. .

An example is provided by the Hurwitz zeta function,

which holds for all , .

Abel also gave the following variation for alternating sums:

which is related to the Lindelöf summation formula

Proof 

Taking  with the residue theorem 

Then

Using the Cauchy integral theorem for the last one.  thus obtaining

This identity stays true by analytic continuation everywhere the integral converges, letting  we obtain the Abel–Plana formula

The case ƒ(0) ≠ 0 is obtained similarly, replacing  by two integrals following the same curves with a small indentation on the left and right of 0.

See also 
 Euler–Maclaurin summation formula
 Euler–Boole summation

References

External links

Summability methods